Bryanston, Gauteng is an affluent residential suburb of Sandton, South Africa north of Johannesburg . First named as an area in 1949, it was established in 1969 as a suburb of Sandton and provided with tarred roads and municipal services , but after municipal boundaries were revised following the end of Apartheid, Sandton was merged with Johannesburg to form part of the City of Johannesburg Metropolitan Municipality. The multi-lane N1 Western Johannesburg Bypass freeway forms its northern boundary with access at William Nicol offramp. It is located in Region E of the City of Johannesburg Metropolitan Municipality.

Bryanston is bifurcated by Bryanston Drive, running from the outskirts of Randburg to the beginning of Morningside.

The long-established Bryanston Country Club, founded in 1948, is in the heart of Bryanston.
Families with school aged children compose a large part of the Bryanston community due to the excellent private school system that is ranked as best in Gauteng.

Hospital 
Mediclinic Sandton is one of the biggest hospitals in Gauteng. It is a private hospital operating 24-hour emergency services. The hospital is located in the heart of Bryanston, on the corner of Main Road and Peter Place.

Housing 
Whilst the houses in Bryanston were once, on average, fairly large with gardens that contained many trees, over the past decades the larger properties are being converted into multi-dwelling complexes, with more houses and smaller gardens. This shift is likely caused by a combination of security reasons, an ever-increasing lack of residential space (since many people want to live in the suburb) and the high cost of city property rates and taxes in the area.
 
Bryanston is likely named after a village in the UK., or after Bryanston Square, also in the UK.

Economy
Many large corporations are based in Bryanston, such as Dimension Data (DiData), which runs a large corporate campus (The Campus), GlaxoSmithKline, which are also based at The Campus, Facebook, Nestle, Microsoft Corporation, Ogilvy & Mather, Tiger Brands, Ipsos and
Google South Africa.

Notable residents past and present
Sol Kerzner, K.C.M.G., founder of Sun International
Jani Allan, columnist
Roger Ballen, photographer
Sarah Britten, author
Charlene Leonora Smith, author  
Kiernan Jarryd Forbes AKA, rapper
Leka I, Crown Prince of Albania, Exiled Prince of Albania
Anele Mdoda, South Africa radio and tv personality

References

Johannesburg Region E
1949 establishments in South Africa